Wayne van As (born 27 February 1968) is a South African cricketer. He played in sixteen first-class and six List A matches for Boland from 1991/92 to 1994/95.

See also
 List of Boland representative cricketers

References

External links
 

1968 births
Living people
South African cricketers
Boland cricketers
Sportspeople from Bulawayo